Harpidium is a genus of lichen-forming fungi in the family Harpidiaceae. The genus contains three species. Harpidium was circumscribed in 1855 by German lichenologist Gustav Wilhelm Körber, with Harpidium rutilans assigned as the type species.

Species
 Harpidium gavilaniae 
 Harpidium longisporum 
 Harpidium nashii 
 Harpidium rutilans 

The taxon Harpidium glaucophanum  is now known as Rhizoplaca glaucophana.

References

Pezizomycotina
Ascomycota genera
Lichen genera
Taxa described in 1855
Taxa named by Gustav Wilhelm Körber